The 2012 NSW Premier League season was the 12th season of the revamped NSW Premier League. Despite the Parramatta Eagles finishing last on the ladder, Bankstown City Lions were relegated due to finishing last in the Club Championship. They are replaced by the Blacktown Spartans, who were promoted after winning the 2011 NSW Super League season.

League table

League Finals

Top goalscorers 
Source:NSW Premier League

(C)=Regular season champions
(R)=Relegated to NSW Super League
(Q)=Qualified for the Finals Series

References

External links 
 NSW Premier League official website

NSW Premier League
NSW Premier League season
2012